Strange Affair may refer to:

 Strange Affair (1944 film), a mystery
 The Strange Affair, a 1968 British crime film
 Strange Affair (1981 film), a French drama
 Strange Affair (album), a 1991 album by Wishbone Ash
 Strange Affair (novel), a 2005 mystery by Peter Robinson

See also
 The Strange Affair of Uncle Harry, 1945 American film noir drama directed by Robert Siodmak
 The Strange Affair of Spring-Heeled Jack, 2005 novel in the Burton & Swinburne series by Mark Hodder